Fulton Freeman (May 7, 1915 Pasadena, California - December 14, 1974) was the American ambassador to Mexico (1964-1969) and Colombia (1961-1964), and president of the Monterey Institute of Foreign Studies since 1969.

Freeman graduated from Pomona College in 1937.

External links
The Association for Diplomatic Studies and Training Foreign Affairs Oral History Program Foreign Service Spouse Series Phyllis Freeman

References

1915 births
1974 deaths
Pomona College alumni
20th-century American diplomats
Ambassadors of the United States to Colombia
Ambassadors of the United States to Mexico
Presidents of the Monterey Institute of Foreign Studies